William Hodge was a Scottish professional footballer who played for Rangers and Brentford as a full back.

Career 
Hodge began his career in Scotland with Scottish Division One club Rangers, but was behind Tommy Muirhead in the half back pecking order and made only two appearances for the club. He moved to England to join Third Division South club Brentford in August 1927. An injury to Tom Adamson in October 1929 allowed Hodge to blossom as a full back. Hodge was part of the Bees team which was crowned Third Division South champions at the end of the 1932–33 season, making 25 appearances. In the Second Division, Hodge lost his place at full back to Arthur Bateman and departed the club in 1935. Hodge made 125 appearances and scored one goal during his seven years at Griffin Park.

Personal life 
Hodge was born in Croy and grew up in Twechar. His brother Robert was also a footballer.

Career statistics

Honours 
Brentford
Football League Third Division South: 1932–33
 London Charity Fund: 1928

References

Year of death missing
Scottish footballers
Association football wing halves
Brentford F.C. players
English Football League players
1904 births
Rangers F.C. players
Scottish Football League players
Association football fullbacks
Scottish expatriate footballers
Footballers from North Lanarkshire
Sportspeople from East Dunbartonshire
Baillieston Juniors F.C. players
People from Croy